Turang Tappeh (also Romanized as Tūrang Tappeh) is a village in Estarabad-e Shomali Rural District, Baharan District, Gorgan County, Golestan Province, Iran. At the 2006 census, its population was 661, in 171 families.

The archaeological site of Tureng Tepe is located nearby.

References 

Populated places in Gorgan County